The Viet Museum or the Museum of the Boat People & the Republic of Vietnam is a museum focusing on the experience of Vietnamese Americans and their journey from Vietnam to the United States. It is located in Greenwalt House, a historical home relocated to History Park at Kelley Park in San Jose, California, United States, and was opened on August 25, 2007.

The museum was created by the San Jose-based nonprofit organization IRCC (Immigrant Resettlement & Cultural Center, Inc.), headed by Vũ Văn Lộc, a former colonel in the Army of the Republic of Vietnam. Planning for the Museum began in 1976, taking over 30 years to realize. It is believed to be the only museum in the world to exhibit artifacts related to the Vietnamese diaspora.

The Viet Museum's collections focus on three periods:
1950–1975: The Republic of Vietnam and the War in the name of Freedom
1975–1996: The "Boat People" and the quest for Freedom
1975–2007: Vietnamese Americans today and the building of Liberty

References

External links
Viet Museum official site
photo
Viet Museum photo

Museums established in 2007
South Vietnam
Vietnamese-American history
Vietnamese-American culture in California
Vietnamese migration
Vietnamese refugees
Museums in San Jose, California
Ethnic museums in California
2007 establishments in California